Petar Relić (26 June 1913–8 June 1990), nicknamed Čeda, was a Yugoslav partisan fighter and politician. He participated in the liberation of Yugoslavia from the Axis powers and afterwards awarded the Order of the People's Hero. 

He held high political office in the Socialist Federal Republic of Yugoslavia, the Socialist Republic of Serbia, and the Socialist Autonomous Province of Vojvodina, serving for a time as president of the province's executive council (i.e., effectively as its prime minister).

References

1919 births
1990 deaths
People from Inđija
Yugoslav Partisans
Politicians of Vojvodina
Members of the Executive Council of Vojvodina
Stub-Class Yugoslavia articles